Stjernøya is an island in western Troms og Finnmark county, Norway. The  island sits at the mouth of the Altafjorden on the south side of the Sørøysundet strait. It is divided among the municipalities of Loppa, Hasvik, and Alta. One of the larger fjords on the island is the Sørfjorden. There were 80 residents on the mountainous island in 2012. The main population area is at the village of Store Kvalfjord on the northeastern side of the island. On the southern part of the island there is a large nepheline syenite mine at Lillebukt. The island is separated from the mainland by the strait of Stjernsundet.

See also
List of islands of Norway

References

Hasvik
Loppa
Alta, Norway
Islands of Troms og Finnmark